Tapinoma subboreale is a species of ant in the genus Tapinoma. Described by Seifert in 2012, the species is endemic to Europe.

References

Tapinoma
Hymenoptera of Europe
Insects described in 2012